Platypeza is a genus of flat-footed flies (insects in the family Platypezidae). There are at least 30 described species in Platypeza.

Species
These 32 species belong to the genus Platypeza:

Platypeza alternata Kessel and Kessel, 1967 i c g
Platypeza anthrax Loew, 1869 i c g b
Platypeza aterrima Walker, 1835 c g
Platypeza banksi Johnson, 1923 i c g
Platypeza burmensis Chandler, 1994 c g
Platypeza cinerea Snow, 1894 i c g
Platypeza coeruleoceps Matsumura, 1931 c g
Platypeza consobrina Zetterstedt, 1844 c g
Platypeza egregia Snow, 1894 i c g
Platypeza eoa Shatalkin, 1981 c g
Platypeza fasciata Meigen, 1803
Platypeza femina Kessel and Kessel, 1967 i c g
Platypeza gyrodroma Shatalkin, 1985 c g
Platypeza hirticeps Verrall, 1901
Platypeza inornata Loew, 1858 c g
Platypeza lugens Loew, 1858 c g
Platypeza malaisei Chandler, 1994 c g
Platypeza melanostola Shatalkin, 1980 c g
Platypeza mexicana Kessel and Kessel, 1966 i c g
Platypeza millironi Kessel, 1966 i c g
Platypeza nudifacies Shatalkin, 1980 c g
Platypeza nudifascies Shatalkin, 1980 c g
Platypeza obscura Loew, 1866 i c g
Platypeza pulla Snow, 1895 i c g
Platypeza rhodesiensis (Kessel, 1957) c g
Platypeza sauteri (Oldenberg, 1914) c g
Platypeza taeniata Snow, 1894 i c g b
Platypeza tephrura Shatalkin, 1985 c g
Platypeza thomasseti Brunnetti, 1929 c g
Platypeza thomseni Shannon, 1927 c g
Platypeza tucumana Shannon, 1927 c g
Platypeza unicolor Snow, 1895 i c g

Data sources: i = ITIS, c = Catalogue of Life, g = GBIF, b = Bugguide.net

References

Further reading

External links

 

Platypezidae
Articles created by Qbugbot
Platypezoidea genera